Bilad al-Musa is a village in the sub-governorate of Bariq in the province of Asir, Saudi Arabia. It is located at an elevation of 435 meters and had a population of 5,000 in 1970. It is connected with the main road by a 3 kilometer road. The headman is Ahmed Hiyazah Fayiz Hiyazah.

See also 

 List of cities and towns in Saudi Arabia
 Regions of Saudi Arabia

References 

Populated places in Bareq
Populated places in 'Asir Province
Populated coastal places in Saudi Arabia